Msabbaha (also romanized musabbaha, literally "something soaked" also known as mashausha or mashawsha is a runnier variation of hummus made up of whole garbanzo beans and tahini popular in the Levant.

Ingredients
The main difference between msabbaha and hummus is the texture. In contrast with hummus, the chickpeas here remain whole. It sometimes contains hard-boiled egg, and like hummus, it is typically eaten with fresh pita bread.

The base of the dish is balila: warm cooked chickpeas in their own soak-water with a little added cumin, chopped parsley and lemon or lime juice. Pine nuts fried in olive oil or samneh (clarified butter) are sometimes poured over the balila. Other ingredients include tahini and minced garlic.

A variation of msabbaha common in Damascus serves chickpeas and tahini with melted butter, pomegranate or lemon juice, and pistachios or pine nuts. In Lebanon, it is known as masabaha or mashawsha, and may be served with a hot sauce condiment with side dishes. It is also sold prepackaged.

References

Appetizers
Arab cuisine
Lebanese cuisine
Palestinian cuisine
Jordanian cuisine
Syrian cuisine
Hummus
 Israeli cuisine
Levantine cuisine
Chickpea dishes
Vegan cuisine